PalaNesima is an indoor sporting arena located in Catania, Italy. The capacity of the arena is 6,000 spectators.

It was planned to be used for the 1997 Summer Universiade.

References 

Indoor arenas in Italy
Sports venues in Catania
1990 establishments in Italy
Sports venues completed in 1990